Goldbach is a village and a former municipality in the district of Gotha, in Thuringia, Germany. Since 1 January 2019, it is part of the municipality Nessetal.

People from Goldbach 
 Emil Lerp (1886-1966), German businessman and inventor of transportable gasoline chainsaw

References

Gotha (district)
Saxe-Coburg and Gotha
Former municipalities in Thuringia